Dr. Carol Diane Lee (also Safisha Madhubuti) is an American professor, educational researcher, school director and author. Now retired, Lee was the Edwina S. Tarry Professor of Education and Social Policy, Professor of Learning Sciences, and Professor of African-American Studies at Northwestern University. Her scholarly interests focus on the influences of culture and literacy on education, particularly among students in the African-American community. She chairs the Board of Director of the Betty Shabbazz International Charter Schools, an institution she helped found.

Lee has been nationally recognized and honored by numerous organizations for her years of service, mentorship, and social activism including the American Association of Colleges for Teacher Education (AACTE), the American Association of Blacks in Higher Education, the American Educational Research Association (AERA), the Federation of Associations in Behavioral and Brain Sciences (FABBS), the National Academy of Education (NAE), the American Academy of Arts and Sciences (AAAS), and the Black United Fund of Chicago. She has also garnered international recognition having been awarded an Honorary Doctorate from the University of Pretoria and having twice led the American delegation of the People to People's Ambassador Program to South Africa and China.

Lee is the author of Culture, Literacy and Learning: Taking Bloom in the Midst of the Whirlwind and Signifying As a Scaffold for Literary Interpretation: The Pedagogical Implications of an African American Discourse Genre. With Peter Smagorinsky, Lee edited the volume Vygotskian Perspectives on Literacy Research: Constructing Meaning Through Collaborative Inquiry.

Biography 
Lee was born on August 26, 1945. She grew up in Chicago, attended Chicago Public Schools, and graduated from Crane High School. She spent her freshman year at Illinois Wesleyan University, then transferred to the University of Illinois at Urbana-Champaign where she stayed for the remainder of her undergraduate tenure, graduating with a Bachelor of Arts in the Teaching of Secondary School English in 1966. She obtained her Master of Arts in English in 1969 at the University of Chicago, and returned there to complete her Ph.D. degree in Education (Curriculum & Instruction) in 1991.

After earning her bachelor's degree, Lee taught English at Englewood High School and later at Kennedy-King College, both in Chicago. Around that time, she became socially active in the Black Arts Movement, and it was then she met and eventually married Haki Madhubuti (born Don L. Lee). Together, they founded the New Concept Development Center, an African-centered school, in 1972, the progenitor of the Betty Shabbazz International Charter School network and the New Concept School, a pre-K institution.

In 1991, after finishing her doctorate at the University of Chicago and completing 16 years of service at the New Concept School, Lee joined the faculty at Northwestern University in the School of Education and Public Policy. In 2018, she retired as the Edwina S. Tarry Professor of Education and Social Policy at Northwestern University.

Research 
Lee is known for her efforts to develop culturally responsive educational systems that use students' knowledge from their daily lives to support their academic learning and development in school settings. Lee's theory of "cultural modeling" is principled on the concept that individual learning is inextricably linked to one's interactions and relationships in a culturally dynamic society; therefore, social knowledge can serve as a pedagogical bridge. Cultural modeling evolved from the ideas of cultural-historical psychology, originally propagated by Lev Vygotsky, Alexander Luria, and Aleksei N. Leontiev in the early 20th century. Lee's approach to pedagogy shares common origins with cultural-historical activity theory  developed by Lee's contemporaries Yrjö Engeström and Michael Cole.

Lee's professional roots as an English teacher and her personal social awakening during the Black Arts Movement feature prominently in cultural modeling, where a strong focus on reading, literary study, and linguistics and a full embrace of one's social background and cultural history are fundamental. The scholarly works of African-American linguists Lorenzo Dow Turner, Geneva Smitherman, and Henry-Louis Gates, Jr.  informed Lee's integration of African-American Vernacular English into her pedagogical approach in which she used the act of signifying and other cultural and traditional elements central to the lives and experiences of inner-city African-American students to scaffold instruction of complex, formal literature. In one of its earliest experimental applications, Lee used cultural modeling to help students, initially described as low-skilled and unmotivated, become enthusiastic readers capable of analyzing critical novels by African-American writers, such as "Their Eyes Were Watching God" by Zora Neale Hurston and "The Color Purple" by Alice Walker.

Cultural modeling has inspired research and adoption in other cultural contexts, particularly among immigrant and other non-dominant communities across the United States and around the world. Completing the circle, Lee's innovative approach endures where it was first implemented almost five decades ago—the New Concept School and Betty Shabbazz International Charter Schools she helped found.

Representative publications 
 Lee, C. D. (1995). "A culturally based cognitive apprenticeship: Teaching African American high school students skills in literary interpretation". Reading Research Quarterly, 30(4), 608–630.
 Lee, C. D. (2001). "Is October Brown Chinese? A cultural modeling activity system for underachieving students". American Educational Research Journal, 38(1), 97–141. 
 Lee, C. D. (2003). "Toward a framework for culturally responsive design in multimedia computer environments: Cultural modeling as a case". Mind, Culture, and Activity, 10(1), 42–61. 
Lee, C. D. (2008). "The centrality of culture to the scientific study of learning and development: How an ecological framework in education research facilitates civic responsibility". Educational Researcher, 37(5), 267–279.
Lee, C. D., & A. Spratley (2010). Reading in the disciplines: The challenges of adolescent literacy. Final report from Carnegie Corporation of New York's Council on Advancing Adolescent Literacy. Carnegie Corporation of New York.
Nasir, N. I. S., A. S. Rosebery, B. Warren, & C. D. Lee (2006). "Learning as a cultural process: Achieving equity through diversity". In R. K. Sawyer (ed.), The Cambridge Handbook of the Learning Sciences (pp. 489–504). Cambridge University Press.

References

External links 
Faculty page 
In Honor of Carol D. Lee, FABBS

University of Chicago alumni
Black Arts Movement
Northwestern University faculty
Educators from Illinois
Writers from Chicago
1945 births
Living people
American women academics
21st-century American women